Alexander 'Alex' Michael Fugallo (born 1970), is a male former athlete who competed for England.

Athletics career
Fugallo represented England in the 400 metres and won a gold medal in the 4 x 400 metres event, at the 1994 Commonwealth Games in Victoria, British Columbia, Canada. He is credited with winning a gold medal because he ran in the heats that helped England qualify for the final.

References

1970 births
Living people
English male sprinters
Commonwealth Games medallists in athletics
Commonwealth Games gold medallists for England
Athletes (track and field) at the 1994 Commonwealth Games
20th-century English people
Medallists at the 1994 Commonwealth Games